Kattankudy Urban Council (KUC) is the local authority for the town of Kattankudy in eastern Sri Lanka. KUC is responsible for providing a variety of local public services including roads, sanitation, drains, housing, libraries, public parks and recreational facilities. It has 9 members elected using the open list proportional representation system.

Election results

2006 local government election
Results of the local government election held on 20 May 2006:

The following candidates were elected: Sahul Hameed Mohamed Asfer (SLMC); Aliyar Lebbe Abdul Jawath (SLMC); Meera Mohaideen Kalanther Lebbe (SLMC); Ahamed Lebbe Mohamed Marzook (SLMC); Umar Lebbe Mohamed Noorul Mubeen (SLMC); Abdul Majeedu Mohamadu Rauffu (UPFA); Abdul Azeez Mohamed Rooby (NC); Atham Lebbe Mohamed Saleem (SLMC); and Abdul Sathar Muhammed Zulfi (Ind 3).

Aliyar Lebbe Abdul Jawath (SLMC) and Umar Lebbe Mohamed Noorul Mubeen (SLMC) were appointed Chairman and Deputy Chairman respectively.

The term of the council was due to expire in 2010 but on 22 December 2009 Minister of Local Government and Provincial Councils Janaka Bandara Tennakoon extended it until 31 March 2011.

2011 local government election
Results of the local government election held on 17 March 2011:

The following candidates were elected: Hayathu Mohamed Mohamed Bakkir; Asfar Mohamed Shahul Hameed (UPFA); Abdul Gafoor Muhamathu Haroon; Mohamed Ibraheem Mohamed Jaseem (UPFA); Mohamed Musthafa Abdul Latheef; Muhamathu Musthafa Abdul Rahuman; Abdul Majeed Mohamed Rauff; Ameer hamsa Ummu Salma; and Mohamed Sudeek Mohamed Siyad.

Asfar Mohamed Shahul Hameed (UPFA) and Mohamed Ibraheem Mohamed Jaseem (UPFA) were appointed Chairman and Deputy Chairman respectively.

References

Government of Batticaloa District
Local authorities in Eastern Province, Sri Lanka
Urban councils of Sri Lanka